Bad Freienwalde is a spa town in the Märkisch-Oderland district in Brandenburg, Germany.

Geography
The town is situated on the Alte Oder, an old branch of the Oder River at the northwestern rim of the Oderbruch basin and the steep rise of the Barnim Plateau.
The municipal area comprises the following villages: Altranft, Altglietzen, Bralitz, Hohensaaten, Hohenwutzen, Neuenhagen and Schiffmühle.

History

The settlement of Vrienwalde in the Margraviate of Brandenburg was first mentioned in a 1316 deed and appeared as a town in 1364. From 1618, the Freienwalde manor was directly held by the Brandenburg prince-electors (Kurfürsten).

A mineral spring was discovered in 1683. The alchemist Johann Kunckel brought it to the attention of the "Great Elector" Frederick William of Brandenburg, who, gout-ridden,  arrived in Freienwalde the next year. Recorded by the physician Bernhardus Albinus in 1685, the Kurfürstenquelle became the foundation of Freienwalde's rise as a spa town. Frederick William's son King Frederick I of Prussia had a first maison de plaisance erected by the architect Andreas Schlüter.

The development was further promoted, when in 1799 the small Neoclassical Freienwalde Castle was built according to plans by David Gilly as a summer residence of Princess Frederika Louisa of Hesse-Darmstadt, the widow of King Frederick William II of Prussia. Its park was redesigned by Peter Joseph Lenné in 1822. The industrialist and politician Walther Rathenau acquired the palace in 1909, it was nationalised after his assassination in 1922. Freienwalde achieved the official status of spa town (Bad) in 1925.

Notable people

Elisabeth Radziwill, (1803−1834), beloved of Prince Wilhelm I of Prussia died at Freienwalde
Edith Andreae (1883–1952) salonière and sister of Walter Rathenau.
 Alfred Blaschko (1858–1922), dermatologist
Hilde Jennings (1906-unknown), actress
 Hans Keilson (1909–2011), Dutch psychotherapist, novelist
 Kurt Kretschmann (1914-2007) nature conservationist
 Erwin Wickert (1915-2008), German diplomat 
 Ferdinand Friedrich Zimmermann (1898-1967), journalist, publicist and Sturmbannführer
Volkmar Sigusch (born 1940), sexologist and physician
Hildegard und Siegfried Schumacher, children's book authors

Demography

International relations

Bad Freienwalde is twinned with:
  Bad Pyrmont, Germany
  Międzyrzecz, Poland

References

External links

Localities in Märkisch-Oderland
Spa towns in Germany